Amythyst Kiah (born 11 December 1986) is an American singer-songwriter. Kiah is a native of Chattanooga, Tennessee and currently lives in Johnson City. She plays guitar and banjo.

As of 2022, Kiah has released two solo albums and one EP. She has also appeared (along with Rhiannon Giddens, Leyla McCalla, and Allison Russell) on the album Songs of Our Native Daughters (2019). Kiah earned a 2020 Grammy Award Best American Roots Song nomination for her song "Black Myself".

Life and career

1986–2013: Early life 
Kiah was born in Chattanooga, Tennessee, United States. Her father (who is also her tour manager) sang and played percussion in a band in the 1970s. Her mother sang in the church growing up. She attended a creative arts high school and taught herself to play guitar. When she was 17 her mother committed suicide, and singing at her funeral was Kiah's third public performance.

Kiah is a graduate of East Tennessee State University, where she completed the Bluegrass, Old Time, and Country Music Studies program and joined the school's marquee old-time band.

She has been touring since 2010 either solo, with band she called 'Her Chest of Glass' or with her fellow 'Our Native Daughters'.

2013 onwards: recording artist 
Kiah describes her style as "Southern Gothic"'

Kiah released her first album, Dig in 2013. The album was produced by Kiah and recorded at East Tennessee State University Recording Lab.

This was followed by an EP, Her Chest of Glass released on October 28, 2016. Kiah wrote three from five of the EP's songs, which were recorded in Johnson City and produced by Kiah, band members and Travis Kammeyer.

Wary + Strange was released on Rounder Records on 18 June 2021, produced by Tony Berg. Kiah began work on the album in January 2018, and recorded the album three times, with three different producers before feeling happy with the sound. The album received favourable reviews with Glide magazine stating, "This album will be a centerpiece of conversation, not just this year, but in the years to come too" and Rolling Stone including it in their list of "25 Best Country and Americana Albums of 2021". Her song "Wild Turkey"  was named by Variety as one of  the 50 Best Songs of 2021.

In 2021, she was a featured vocalist on Moby's single "Natural Blues" (reprise Version).

On 14 January 2022, she released a cover of Joy Division's "Love Will Tear Us Apart".

Kiah has toured extensively, including throughout the US, Mexico and to the UK.

Participation in Song of Our Native Daughters 
Kiah has also appeared (along with Rhiannon Giddens, Leyla McCalla, and Allison Russell) on the album Songs of Our Native Daughters (2019). Kiah earned a 2020 Grammy Award Best American Roots Song nomination for her song "Black Myself" which featured on this album.

Personal life 
Kiah has described herself as "funny-talking, sci-fi-loving, queer Black". She has stated that making music has helped her cope with anxiety around her identity, and that she sees it as a means of increasing the visibility of Black creators. She currently lives in Johnson City, Tennessee.

Discography

Albums
Dig (2013)
Her Chest Of Glass (2017)
Wary + Strange (2021)

Singles
"Your Ghost" (2020) with Dave Hause and Kam Franklin
"Natural Blues" (2021) by Moby with Amythyst Kiah
"Black Myself" (2021) Moby Remix

References

1986 births
Living people
21st-century LGBT people
African-American women songwriters
East Tennessee State University alumni
American banjoists
Appalachian music